Solgne is a commune in the Moselle department in Grand Est in north-eastern France. As of 2014 it had a population of 1,092.

History
Solgne became part of France in 1661, but Alsace-Lorraine which Solgne lay in, was later under the German Empire from 1871 to 1918. Église Saint-Étienne was built in 1718 and restored in 1859.
The village of Ancy-les-Solgne joined Solgne in 1810.

Geography
The commune borders the communes of Buchy, Luppy, Secourt, Sailly-Achâtel and lies at an altitude of between 240 and 299 metres above sea level. It covers an area of 7.3 km². with 154,5 inhabitants per km² as of 2010. The Solgne Fault runs through the villages of Solgne and Achatel.

Notable people
Paul Bonatz (1877-1956) -German architect
Simon Delestre (1981-) -equestrian

See also
Communes of the Moselle department

References

External links

Official site 

Communes of Moselle (department)